Selig Hecht (1892–1947) was an American physiologist who studied photochemistry in photoreceptor cells.

Life
Hecht was born in Glogau, then in the German Empire (now Głogów in Poland), the son of Mandel Hecht and Mary Mresse. The family migrated to the USA in 1898, settling in New York City. His studies and talents led to Columbia University making him professor of biophysics in 1928.

In June 1917 Hecht received his Ph.D. and married Celia Huebschmann. Their daughter Maressa was born in 1924.

Hecht began his study into light sensitivity with clams (Mya arenaria) and insects. His specialty was photochemistry, the kinetics of the reactions initiated by light in the receptors. He made contributions to the knowledge of dark adaptation, visual acuity, brightness discrimination, color vision, and the mechanism of the visual threshold.

He spent time as a post-doctoral researcher with the group of Edward Charles Cyril Baly at the University of Liverpool, UK. Baly was a pioneer in the application of the technique of spectroscopy in chemistry, and Hecht took this further by applying it to biological molecules.

Hecht's responsibility in showing the protein character of rhodopsin was recounted by historians of protein science:
Identification of visual purple as a protein of high molecular weight ...[came] from the work of Selig Hecht at Columbia University in New York, begun in 1937. Ultracentrifugation was one of methods he used  for characterization and this produced an added dividend, demonstrating that the complex absorption of the 'pigment' (suggesting the possibility of many components) segmented in toto with the protein. By  this  time the carotenoid prosthetic group had been discovered as the source of colour by George Wald and Hecht pointed out that  this  meant that the  protein had to be  a conjugated protein, with the chromophore firmly attached.

According to biographer Pirenne, Hecht was a "brilliant lecturer and expositor." Pirenne continues, 
The lack of synthesis discernible in present-day knowledge and teaching perturbed him, and he took an active interest in all the human implications of science. He dealt with persons and ideas on the basis of their intrinsic worth,...

Explaining the atom
When World War II ended with the use of atomic weapons which had been developed in secret by the Manhattan Project, Hecht was concerned that the American public was uninformed about the development of this new source of energy. He wrote a book Explaining the Atom (1947), to educate the public. He wrote,
So long as one supposes this business is mysterious and secret, one cannot have a just evaluation of our possessions and security. Only by understanding the basis and development of atomic energy can one judge the legislation and foreign policy that concern it.

In a review in the New York Times (4/27/1947), Stephen Wheeler wrote that it was "by all odds the best book on atomic energy so far to be published for the ordinary reader." Similarly, James J. Jelinek wrote that it was an "invaluable contribution to the layman." He credits Hecht with "conveying to the layman the intellectual drama" of the development. Jelinek asserts that the book is "profoundly provocative in its political and sociological implications."

After Hecht died, a second edition was issued in 1959 by Eugene Rabinowitch. Both editions were recommended by George Gamow.

References

 Hecht, S. (1937) "Rods, cones, and the chemical basis of vision", Physiological Reviews 17: 239 to 89.
 Hecht, S. & Pickels, E.G. (1938) "The sedimentation constant of visual purple", Proceedings of the National Academy of Sciences of the USA 24: 172 to 6

1892 births
1947 deaths
American physiologists
Photochemists
Columbia University faculty
German emigrants to the United States